Roller Coaster (Vietnamese: Tàu Lộn Vòng Siêu Tốc) is a steel
The ride was built in late 2008. Prior to 2017, it was the tallest coaster in Vietnam. Prior to that, it was also the fastest roller coaster, and the one with the most inversions, in Vietnam.

Except for the second loop the ride is almost an exact duplicate of a similar roller coaster at Dam Sen Cultural Park.

Ride experience 
The ride begins with a small drop, before the trains make a sharp U-turn to the right. Riders immediately climb the lift hill . Trains again make a small drop, and another turn to the right, this is followed by a 27-metre drop. Trains then go through the double loop, the first of its kind in Vietnam. Then comes a double corkscrew, inverting the riders twice. Riders experience another large turn before coming to a stop.

See also 
Some roller coasters with similar track layout:
 Corkscrew (Cedar Point)
 Carolina Cyclone (mirror image)
 Roller Coaster (Dam Sen Park)

References

External links 

Dai Nam Van Hien Page
Roller Coaster at RCDB

Roller coasters introduced in 2008
Roller coasters in Vietnam